The 2022 Italian local elections were held in various Italian local communities on 12 June 2022, with a run-off round on 26 June. Local elections in Trentino-Alto Adige/Südtirol were held on 15 May, with a second ballot on 29 May, while local elections in Aosta Valley on 29 May, with a second ballot on 12 June. Elections took place in 980 out of 7,904 municipalities, 26 of which were provincial capitals. Mayors and city councils were elected for the ordinary five-year terms, lasting till 2027.

Voting system
The voting system is used for all mayoral elections in Italy in the cities with a population higher than 15,000 inhabitants. Under this system, voters express a direct choice for the mayor or an indirect choice voting for the party of the candidate's coalition. If no candidate receives 50% of votes during the first round, the top two candidates go to a second round after two weeks. The winning candidate obtains a majority bonus equal to 60% of seats. During the first round, if no candidate gets more than 50% of votes but a coalition of lists gets the majority of 50% of votes or if the mayor is elected in the first round but its coalition gets less than 40% of the valid votes, the majority bonus cannot be assigned to the coalition of the winning mayor candidate.

The election of the City Council is based on a direct choice for the candidate with a maximum of two preferential votes, each for a different gender, belonging to the same party list: the candidate with the majority of the preferences is elected. The number of the seats for each party is determined proportionally, using D'Hondt seat allocation. Only coalitions with more than 3% of votes are eligible to get any seats.

Municipal elections

Mayoral election results

See also
2022 Italian referendum

References

2022 elections in Italy
 
 
Municipal elections in Italy
June 2022 events in Italy